Made in Dagenham is a 2010 British comedy-drama film directed by Nigel Cole and starring Sally Hawkins, Bob Hoskins, Miranda Richardson, Geraldine James, Rosamund Pike, Andrea Riseborough, Jaime Winstone, Daniel Mays and Richard Schiff. It dramatises the Ford sewing machinists strike of 1968 that aimed for equal pay for women. Its theme song, with lyrics by Billy Bragg, is performed by Sandie Shaw, a native of the area and former Ford Dagenham clerk.

A stage musical version of the film opened at London's Adelphi Theatre in 2014.

Plot

Based on a true story, Made in Dagenham explores the movement that caused a significant law reform. Rita O'Grady (a fictional character) leads the 1968 Ford sewing machinists strike at the Ford Dagenham plant, where female workers walk out to protest sexual discrimination, demanding equal pay. The strike drew major attention around the world because it was considered contrary to women's traditional family roles. The successful strike led to the Equal Pay Act 1970.

Locations
 Mardyke estate
 Dagenham Civic Centre
 Eastbourne
 Merthyr Tydfil

Cast

Reception
Of 122 Rotten Tomatoes reviews, 80% of critics gave the film a positive review. Maclean's, in a review for the film's 2010 Toronto International Film Festival premiere, called it a ".. combination of Milk and Mad Men.. It’s a film that blatantly condemns sexism and shows, despite its mostly light tone, the real cost of fighting for civil rights. The bee-hived and bobbed characters are fully fleshed and well-rounded even though they fit into ’60s archetypes,  and the period piece balances optimism and realism in a way that’s both compelling and fun to watch."

Xan Brooks of The Guardian gave it three stars out of five, calling it ".. uncomplicated fare, overly spiced with 60s cliches.... But the film is also robust, amiable and so warm-hearted you'd be a churl to take against it.", while David Cox, also of The Guardian, gave a less glowing review, suggesting that, despite initial potential, ".. a promising opportunity has been squandered."

Roger Ebert gave the film three and a half stars out of four.  Mark Kermode praised the film highly on his weekly show on BBC Radio 5 Live. He ranked it as his fourth favourite film of 2010, beating such films as The Social Network and Another Year.

Accolades
Made in Dagenham was nominated for four awards at the 2010 British Academy Film Awards; Outstanding British Film, Costume Design, Make Up & Hair Design and Supporting Actress (Miranda Richardson).

Soundtrack
A soundtrack for the film was released, with the following tracks:

 "(There's) Always Something There to Remind Me" - Sandie Shaw
"Get Ready" - The Temptations
 "Israelites" - Desmond Dekker & The Aces
 "It's a Man's Man's Man's World" - James Brown
 "Days" - The Kinks
 "Can I Get a Witness" - Dusty Springfield
 "All or Nothing" - Small Faces
 "The Boat That I Row" - Lulu
 "It's Getting Better" - Mama Cass
 "A Groovy Kind of Love" - The Mindbenders
 "Wooly Bully" - Sam The Sham & The Pharaohs
 "Sunday Will Never Be The Same" - Spanky and Our Gang
 "Green Tambourine" - Lemon Pipers
 "Paper Sun" - Traffic
 "Friday on My Mind" - The Easybeats
 "With a Girl Like You" - The Troggs
 "You Can Get It If You Really Want" - Desmond Dekker
 "Made In Dagenham" - Sandie Shaw

The title song was written by David Arnold and Billy Bragg just for the film.

Musical

A musical adaption of the film opened on 5 November 2014 at the Adelphi Theatre in London. Scripted by Richard Bean and directed by Rupert Goold, it starred Gemma Arterton in the lead role.

References
General references

 BBC Films - Made in Dagenham
 Observer article
 Mark Kermode Uncut - Feeling Good in Dagenham
 Long synopsis at Woolton Picture House
 Information on the Visteon Pension Action Group
 The story of the strike, in an article published by the socialist group Workers' Liberty to mark the 40th anniversary in 2008

Specific references

External links
 
  Made in Dagenham at BFI
  Made in Dagenham at British Council–Film
  Made in Dagenham at Lumiere
 
 
 BBC Film Network - Made in Dagenham interview
 Made in Dagenham The Musical

2010 films
2010 drama films
2010s feminist films
British drama films
Cultural depictions of Harold Wilson
Dagenham
Films about the labor movement
Films produced by Elizabeth Karlsen
Films scored by David Arnold
Films set in 1968
Films set in London
Ford of Europe
Number 9 Films films
Paramount Pictures films
Sony Pictures Classics films
Films directed by Nigel Cole
2010s English-language films
2010s British films